Janis may refer to:

As a first name

Janis Amatuzio (born 1950), American forensic pathologist
Janis Antonovics (born 1942), Latvian-British-American biologist
Janis Babson (1950–1961), Canadian child, organ donation
Janis Carter (1913–1994), American actress
Jānis Daliņš (1904–1978), Latvian athlete
Janis Hughes (born 1958), British politician
Janis Ian (born 1951), American songwriter and folksinger
Janis Irwin (born 1984), Canadian politician
Janis Joplin (1943–1970), American singer and songwriter
Janis Kelly (volleyball) (born 1971), Canadian volleyball player
Janis Kelly (soprano), Scottish opera singer
Janis Paige (born 1922), American actress
Janis Rozentāls (1866–1916), Latvian painter
Janis Tanaka (born 1963), American bassist
Janis Winehouse, British pharmacist, mother of Amy Winehouse

Fictional characters
Janis Gold, a fictional character on 24
Janis Day, one of the two main characters in the comic strip Arlo and Janis
Janis Hawk, a main character in the TV series FlashForward
Janis Ian, a character in the film Mean Girls
Janis (ジャニス, "Janisu"), main character of Inuyasha: Secret of the Divine Jewel]]As a surname

Byron Janis (born 1928), American concert pianist (no relation to Conrad Janis)
Conrad Janis (born 1928), American actor and jazz musician (no relation to Byron Janis)
Dorothy Janis (1912 –2010), American silent film actress
Elsie Janis (1889–1956), American musical theatre and vaudeville performer
Irving Janis, a social psychologist who pioneered the groupthink theory
Jaroslav Janiš, Czech auto racing driver
Linzie Janis, an American television journalist
Sidney Janis, (1896–1989), American art dealer, collector, and writer
Vivi Janiss (1911–1988), American actress

Other uses
Janis (software), a program by Nuclear Energy Agency to view nuclear information
Janis (film), a 1974 film about Janis Joplin
 Janis (1975 album), a compilation and the soundtrack album for the film
 Janis (1993 album), a Joplin career overview collection
 "Janis", a track recorded by Focus on their 1971 album Focus IIUnited States v. Janis'', a 1976 U.S. Supreme Court case

See also
Janus (disambiguation)
Jani (disambiguation)
Janice (disambiguation)